Joseph Pointer (12 June 1875 – 19 November 1914) was a patternmaker who became a British Labour Party Member of Parliament.

Born in the Attercliffe district of Sheffield, Pointer became a convinced socialist early in his life, and joined the Independent Labour Party.  He attended Ruskin College in Oxford for six months to study Constitutional History and Sociology.

On his return to Sheffield, Pointer took part in a strike, and was thereafter unable to gain regular employment.  He was nonetheless elected Chair of the Sheffield Trades Council, and stood unsuccessfully for Sheffield City Council in 1906 and 1907.  In 1908, he was finally elected for the Brightside ward.

In 1909, J. Batty Langley, Liberal Party MP for Sheffield Attercliffe died, and Pointer stood for the Labour Party in the ensuing by-election.  With the non Labour vote divided between the Liberal candidate, and both official and unofficial Conservative Party candidates, Pointer achieved a narrow victory, becoming Sheffield's first Labour MP.  He held the seat in both the January and December 1910 general elections, which the Liberal Party did not contest.

In the House of Commons, Pointer was appointed as a junior whip, but died in Sheffield in 1914 aged 39.

References
The Storm of Politics

External links
 Sources for the Study of the election of Sheffield's first Labour Member of Parliament, 1909 Produced by Sheffield City Council's Libraries and Archives

1875 births
1914 deaths
Independent Labour Party MPs
Labour Party (UK) MPs for English constituencies
Patternmakers (industrial)
Trade unionists from Sheffield
Politicians from Sheffield
UK MPs 1906–1910
UK MPs 1910
UK MPs 1910–1918
United Patternmakers' Association-sponsored MPs
People from Darnall